The San Jose Stealth were a member of the National Lacrosse League, the professional box lacrosse league of North America from 2004 until 2009. They played at the HP Pavilion at San Jose, which is also the home of the NHL's San Jose Sharks and the AFL's San Jose SaberCats. They relocated to San Jose, California in 2003, beginning play in the 2004 NLL season. They had previously been the Albany Attack from 2000 to 2003.

On June 17, 2009, the Stealth announced they were moving to Everett, Washington effective immediately, where they would be known as the Washington Stealth. In 2014 they moved to Vancouver and are currently playing as the Vancouver Warriors.

Awards and honors

All time record

Playoff results

See also
Lacrosse
National Lacrosse League
Box lacrosse
Albany Attack
Washington Stealth
Vancouver Stealth

References

San Jose team page at the Outsider's Guide to the NLL

See also
 San Jose Stealth seasons

Defunct National Lacrosse League teams
Lacrosse clubs established in 2004
Lacrosse clubs disestablished in 2009
Lacrosse teams in California
Sports teams in San Jose, California
2004 establishments in California
2009 disestablishments in California